The Calling was an American rock band from Los Angeles, California, formed in 1996 by lead singer and guitarist Alex Band and guitarist Aaron Kamin. The current, official lineup of the band (as of 2020) consists of Band, Daniel Thomson, Travis Loafman & Joey Clement. Thomson and Loafman both joining The Calling in 2016 while Clement later joined in 2020. They are best known for their hit single, "Wherever You Will Go", which topped the Adult Top 40 for 23 weeks, making it the second longest running number one in the chart’s history and later named the number one song of the decade of 2000s on the Adult Pop Charts by Billboard magazine. Their debut album Camino Palmero was released in July 2001 and was a commercial success.

Their second album Two, was released in June 2004. Its lead single "Our Lives" was featured in the closing ceremonies of the 2004 Summer Olympics as well as the opening song of the 78th annual Academy Awards.

The band broke up in 2005, but in 2013, The Calling reformed with a new lineup.

History

Formation (1996–2000)
The band was formed by Alex Band (lead vocals) and Aaron Kamin (lead guitar, backing vocals) when Kamin was dating Band's sister. Kamin and Band initially began jamming and writing songs as far back as 1996, and began gigging under the band name "Generation Gap" with a drummer who was twice their age. At this stage, the band also included saxophonist Benny Golbin, giving the songs a more jazzy sound reminiscent of Dave Matthews Band. Eventually, Band and Kamin ditched the "Gap" lineup, and briefly switched their name to "Next Door", which itself was a nod to Ron Fair, a veteran music business executive and Band's neighbor.

They quickly found their own sound amongst radio rock acts of the early 21st century such as Matchbox Twenty, Third Eye Blind, Train, and Fastball. By 1999, Fair was impressed enough by the demos to sign them to a record deal with RCA. They changed their name to "The Calling", which reflected the band's sense of purpose.

Camino Palmero and departures of Woolstenhulme, Mohler, and Wood (2001–2002)
While the RCA deal was a huge boost, it also created a new problem for Band and Kamin: they had no solid band and, thus, had hardly toured and built a fanbase. Rather than putting them out on the road and building regional support, Fair worked intensely with Band and Kamin for over two years perfecting the debut album. The Calling's first album was recorded from 1999–2001, with Sean Woolstenhulme (formerly with Lifehouse) (rhythm guitar), Billy Mohler (bass), and Nate Wood (drums). The Calling's first album, Camino Palmero, was issued in July 2001 and quickly became a hit due to the strength of its single, "Wherever You Will Go", which was named the No. 1 Adult Pop song of the decade by Billboard magazine. The song was featured prominently in the television series Smallville's first-season episode "Metamorphosis". It was also featured in the 2000 film Coyote Ugly with the group performing in the background in the first club scene, and in early trailers in 2001 for the Star Trek prequel series Enterprise. In an episode of the CBS television drama Cold Case, "Frank's Best", the song is played at the end of the episode. Camino Palmero ultimately sold more than five million copies worldwide and was certified gold in the United States.

In June 2002, Woolstenhulme left The Calling. His replacement was Dino Meneghin. Mohler and Wood left in October 2002. In November 2003, former members Wood and Mohler sued Band, Kamin, and the group's management, accusing them of mismanagement, fraud, and asking for an audit of the money that was spent during their tenures in The Calling. They claimed that they were promised a share of the royalties and profits from touring and merchandise. Band and Kamin claimed that the two were not entitled to any records of the royalties.

Two and first breakup (2003–2005)
In February 10, 2003, The Calling recorded a track for the superhero movie Daredevil, titled "For You". It was released as the third single for the soundtrack album, while also appearing in the EP version. It was used as the closing credits to the film. The band performed the song live on The Tonight Show with Jay Leno in the February 13, 2003 episode. While the song failed to enter the US charts, it did fairly well in Italy, just past the Top 20 at #19.

The Calling announced that they began work on their sophomore album in 2003. In March 29th 2004, they released their lead single Our Lives which made its debut on hot adult contemporary radio the same day. It was featured in the 2004 Olympics ceremony, it was used as the opening song of the 78th annual Academy Awards and used as the theme song to the short lived series "Clubhouse" on CBS. The song was well received and charted at number 34 in the Billboard Top 40. It also reached the Top 20 in countries like Denmark and Italy.

In June 2004, the group returned with their sophomore album titled Two. However, Two had disappointing sales compared to their first album and failed to live up to expectations, charting at number 54 on Billboard Top 200.

A final single, "Anything," performed decently with little promotion, charting at number 23 in the Adult Top 40.

After a lengthy world tour in support of the album, despite the lack of support from the label, Kamin and Band decided to disband The Calling and go on hiatus. They played a farewell show in Temecula, California on June 6, 2005. Alex then began pursuing a solo career and played occasional shows.

Temporary reunion and second breakup  (2013)
On August 15, 2013, Alex Band reformed The Calling with new members. The band performed their comeback gig at Bally's Atlantic City on August 17.  On August 18, Band was reportedly abducted by two men that robbed him, beat him severely, and dumped him on train tracks in Lapeer, Michigan. He was taken to an emergency room at a nearby hospital, where he was treated and released. After only a few shows, the group broke up again.

In October 2016, The Calling reformed with a new lineup and performed in Manila, Philippines the following month. The Australian company "Unbreakable Touring" announced that the band were to perform in areas such as Adelaide, Sydney, Brisbane, Melbourne and Fremantle along with the rock band Juke Kartel and newcomer Mike Waters, but this was later postponed due to visa issues. In July 2017 it was announced that The Calling would be joining Lifehouse as support acts for Live's Australian leg of their world reunion tour.

Band said in an interview with Australian music website "may the rock be with you" in November 2017 that The Calling will be releasing new music soon.

Whilst on tour in February 2020 Band spoke in a video interview presentation with Welsh podcast SteegCast, in the video Band speaks of his future music plans and talks of new material, including even at some point releasing orchestral workings of some of The Calling's best known songs.

Band members
Current members
Alex Band – lead vocals (1996–2005, 2013, 2016–present); rhythm guitar (2016–present)
Daniel Thomson – drums, percussion (2016–present)
Travis Loafman – lead guitar, backing vocals (2016–present); bass (2020)
Joey Clement – bass guitar, backing vocals (2020–present)

Current touring musicians
Ryan Levant – keyboards, backing vocals (2016–present)

Former members
Aaron Kamin – lead guitar, backing vocals (1996–2005); bass (2002–2005); rhythm guitar (2003–2005)
Sean Woolstenhulme – rhythm guitar, backing vocals (1996–2002)
Billy Mohler – bass (1996–2002)
Nate Wood – drums, percussion, backing vocals (1996–2002)
Dino Meneghin – rhythm guitar (2002–2003)
Sean Kipe – lead guitar, rhythm guitar, backing vocals (2013)
Jake Fehres – bass (2013)
Art Pacheco – drums, percussion (2013)

Former touring musicians
Kaveh Rastegar – bass (2004)
Corey Britz – bass, keyboards, backing vocals (2004–2005)
Justin Derrico – lead guitar (2004–2005)
Daniel Damico – rhythm guitar, keyboards, backing vocals (2004–2005)
Justin Meyer – drums, percussion (2004–2005)
Al Berry – bass (2016)
Cubbie Fink – bass, backing vocals (2016–2020)

Timeline

Discography

Studio albums
 Camino Palmero (2001)
 Two (2004)

Awards

References

External links

Musical groups established in 1996
Musical groups disestablished in 2005
Musical groups reestablished in 2013
Musical groups from Los Angeles
Alternative rock groups from California
American post-grunge musical groups
MTV Europe Music Award winners